Afghan insurgency may refer to:
The insurgency waged by the mujahideen during the Soviet–Afghan War
The Taliban insurgency